Sarcohyla psarosema is a species of frogs in the family Hylidae.

It is endemic to the Sierra Madre de Oaxaca of Mexico.
Its natural habitats are subtropical or tropical moist montane forests and rivers.
It is threatened by habitat loss.

Sources

Fauna of the Sierra Madre de Oaxaca
Endemic amphibians of Mexico
Amphibians described in 2000
Taxonomy articles created by Polbot
psarosema